Nicolas Bréhal (Gérald Solnitzki) (6 December 1952 Paris – 31 May 1999 Levallois-Perret) was a French novelist and literary critic.

He was literary director at the Mercure de France and literary critic at Le Monde and Le Figaro.

He won the Prix Valery Larbaud and Grand prix des lectrices de Elle in 1992, for Sonate au clair de Lune. He won the 1993 Prix Renaudot, for Les Corps célestes.

Works
Les Étangs de Woodfield, Mercure de France, 1978
Portrait de femme, l'automne: roman,  Mercure de France, 1980
La Pâleur et le Sang, 1983; French & European Publications, Incorporated, 1988, 
L'Enfant au souffle coupé, Gallimard, 1989, 
Neiges: pièce en quatre actes, Mercure de France, 1995, 
Le Sens de la nuit, 1998; Gallimard, 2001, 
Sonate au clair de Lune, Mercure de France, 1993, Grand prix des lectrices de Elle
Les Corps célestes, Gallimard, 1993, 
Le parfait amour: roman, Mercure de France, 1995, 
La légèreté française: théâtre,  Mercure de France, 2002,

References

External links

http://www.jmolivier.ch/brehal.htm

1952 births
1999 deaths
Writers from Paris
Prix Renaudot winners
Prix Valery Larbaud winners
20th-century French novelists
20th-century French male writers
French male novelists